The Hoosier Hot Shots were an American quartet of musicians who entertained on stage, screen, radio, and records from the mid-1930s into the 1970s. The group formed in Indiana where they performed on local radio before moving to Chicago and a  nationwide broadcasting and recording career. The group later moved to Hollywood to star in western movies.

Members

The Hot Shots' core personnel were multi-instrumentalists, playing brass band instruments as well as their standard instrumentation of guitar (Ken), clarinet (Gabe), string bass (various), and a strange, homemade instrument known both as the "Wabash Washboard" and "the Zither," played by Hezzie. It consisted of a corrugated sheet metal washboard on a metal stand with various noisemakers attached, including bells and a  multi-octave range of squeeze-type bicycle horns; Hezzie Trietsch constructed this instrument himself.  Hezzie also played slide whistle on which he was able to play melodies and variations in addition to effects. The washboard, along with other artifacts from the band, is now in the collection of the Indiana State Museum.

The Hot Shots' repertoire focused on swing and jazz standards and originals, especially those with a comedic element. Powered by a frantic and seemingly freewheeling instrumental virtuosity, grounded in the musical comedy of vaudeville, the Hot Shots were nevertheless able to cover both comic and more serious material, although some of their more serious recordings retain whimsical ornamental elements, capable of evoking a subtle musical irony.

The lineup consisted of the following members:
Ken Trietsch (September 13, 1903 - September 17, 1987)
Hezzie Trietsch (born Paul Trietsch) (April 11, 1905 - April 20, 1980)
Gabe Ward (born Charles Otto Ward) (November 26, 1904 - January 14, 1992)
Frank Kettering (January 1, 1909 - June 9, 1973)
Gil Taylor (born Gilbert Ossian Taylor)
Nate Harrison (born Nathan Harrison) (August 19, 1907 - August 10, 1995)
Billy Keith Milheim

Success in vaudeville and radio
The story of the Hoosier Hot Shots begins in the first years of the 20th century on the Trietsch family farm near Arcadia, Indiana, about 20 miles north of Indianapolis. The Trietsch family grew to be one of four girls and five boys, two of which—Kenneth and  Paul—were to become the nucleus of the Hot Shots.

Growing up in rural Indiana and aided by the example of a banjo-playing father, Kenneth, Paul and the other Trietsch children developed a keen interest in music and developed their various talents. An ensemble featuring father and sons toured the American and Canadian vaudeville circuit for several years. After the family act broke up, Ken and Paul went to work with another vaudeville group called Ezra Buzzington's Rube Band. It was while touring with the Rube Band that they met another Hoosier, Charles Otto Ward, known to his audiences as Gabriel Hawkins. "Gabe" became the third Hot Shot.

When the crash of '29 effectively ended vaudeville they, like other vaudevillians, looked to radio and landed a job at WOWO in Ft. Wayne, Indiana. One day they arrived late for a performance and the announcer greeted them with "Hey, you Hoosier hot shots, get in here!", and the name stuck.

Developing their style in Chicago
In 1933 they moved to Chicago's WLS, the Prairie Farmer Station. Now Paul ("Hezzie", on his washboard), "Gabe" (on clarinet) and Ken (tenor guitar). With the addition in 1934 of Frank Delaney Kettering on bass fiddle, the Hoosier Hot Shots became the quartet that they would remain until the 60s.

In the late 1930s, the group had a five-minute radio show on NBC sponsored by Alka-Seltzer and appeared on National Barn Dance on WLS-AM in Chicago, Illinois; they also had a radio program for one season (1949-1950) on the Mutual Broadcasting System.

Their music was characterized by novelty songs and arrangements – such as "I Like Bananas (Because They Have No Bones)" and "From the Indies to the Andes in His Undies" – hot jazz rhythms and the occasional sweet harmonies. They also played the pop songs of the day, like "Nobody's Sweetheart." Ken kicked off the band with "Are you ready, Hezzie?"—directed at his brother Paul—and it became one of the band's big taglines, even entering the common vernacular.

Recording and film career
Over their career the Hoosier Hot Shots recorded hundreds of 78s for such labels as Banner, Conqueror, Decca, Melotone, Oriole, Perfect, Romeo, and Vocalion. Some of these releases have made it to LPs, cassettes, and compact discs.

Recordings of songs made by the Hoosier Hot Shots often include the signature spoken (by Ken Trietsch) intro, "Are you ready, Hezzie?" followed by the sound of the bustle of the musicians preparing to play their instruments. However, the tightly-rehearsed skill of the performers lets the listener in on the joke as soon as the song actually begins. Their producer avoided recording too many takes of their performances, preferring a spontaneous sound: according to one member, the producer would record at most two takes of a particular song, and use the one that sounded worse.

Between 1937 and 1950, the Hot Shots appeared in more than 20 movies, sharing billing with the likes of Gene Autry, Dale Evans, Bob Wills, the Three Stooges and Merle Travis. During the mid- to late 1940s they starred in their own series of musical westerns for Columbia Pictures.

They were an ongoing presence in the early Billboard magazine country (hillbilly) charts with songs like "Beer Barrel Polka", "When There Are Tears In The Eyes Of The Potato", "Everybody Loves My Baby" and "O-Hi-O".

The World War II era their popularity was at its peak and, in addition to their normal pursuits they toured with the USO in North Africa and Italy.

Frank Kettering left in 1943, and replaced by singer-bassist Gil Taylor. They moved to the West Coast where they continued to make movies, records, stage, and radio appearances. They made the transition to television easily and were seen on such TV shows as the Tex Ritter "Ranch Party."

Legacy
The Hoosier Hot Shots' career was winding down by the late 1950s but they continued recording (adding Keith Milheim on drums) and playing live venues until the death of Hezzie Trietsch (of cancer) on April 20, 1980. Gabe Ward continued to perform solo after the others had died or retired, until shortly before his own death on January 14, 1992.

The Hoosier Hot Shots were not just a comical music act, they were the inspiration for a musical genre that thrived during the '30s, '40s and, thanks to latter-day proponents like "Weird Al" Yankovic and John Lithgow (who recorded a cover of  "From the Indies to the Andes in His Undies" as well as "I Like Bananas Because They Have No Bones"), can still be heard today.

English rock band Half Man Half Biscuit alluded to the Hoosier Hot Shots in their song "Eno Collaboration" with the lyric "I went from the Andes to the Indies in my undies".

Among the acts that were inspired by the Hot Shots were the Freddie Fisher's Schnickelfritz Band, the Korn Kobblers, and Spike Jones and His City Slickers. Spike Jones's early recordings were heavily influenced by the Hoosier Hot Shots. Both Jones and Fisher copied the "Wabash Washboard" developed by Paul (Hezzie) Trietsch.

Further reading

Young, Jordan R. (2005). Spike Jones Off the Record: The Man Who Murdered Music (3rd edition) Albany: BearManor Media .

References

External links

Hoosier Hot Shots site
WLS Radio History

American novelty song performers
Male actors from Indiana
Vocalion Records artists
American comedy musical groups